Tuvalu participates in the Olympic Games in the Summer Olympics. They have yet to compete at the Winter Olympics.

The Tuvalu Association of Sports and National Olympic Committee was recognised as a National Olympic Committee in July 2007. Tuvalu entered the Olympics for the first time at the 2008 Summer Olympics in Beijing, China, with a weightlifter and two athletes in the men's and women's 100-metre sprints. Tuvaluan athletes have yet to progress past the first round of their events.

National Olympic Committee

The Tuvalu Association of Sports and National Olympic Committee (TASNOC) was founded in 2004 under the name 'Tuvalu Association of Sports'. It was renamed to TASNOC and recognized by the IOC as a National Olympic Committee (NOC) on 16 July 2007. Robert Laupula managed the Tuvalu Sports Association and the application for membership of the Olympic movement, which was co-ordinated by the Oceania National Olympic Committees. The TASNOC organizes Tuvalu's participation in the Commonwealth Games as well as the Olympics. The committee has had three different Secretary Generals: Isala T. Isala is the current secretary general, and Eselealofa Apinelu is the president.

Olympics overview

2008 Summer Olympics

Tuvalu sent three athletes to the 2008 Summer Olympics: two in athletics and one in weightlifting. Both Okilani Tinilau and Asenate Manoa set national records in the 100 metres, with times of 11.48 and 14.05 respectively. They were both eliminated in the first heat. Logona Esau finished 21st in the men's −69 kg competition.

2012 Summer Olympics

Three Tuvaluan competitors represented the country at the 2012 Olympics. Weightlifter Tuau Lapua Lapua finished the highest of the Tuvaluan competitors with a 11th place finish in the Men's −62 kg event, finishing with a score of 243. Tavevele Noa and Asenate Manoa were both eliminated in the first heats of the 100 metres, and Manoa set a national record in the women's 100 metres.

2016 Summer Olympics

One athlete competed for Tuvalu in the 2016 Summer Olympics, the only country to send one delegate. Etimoni Timuani competed in the 100 metres, finishing seventh in his heat. He did not advance to the next round.

2020 Summer Olympics

Tuvalu was represented in athletic events by Karalo Maibuca in the men’s 100 metres, and Matie Stanley in the women’s 100 metres.

Medal tables

Flagbearers 

Flag bearers carry the national flag of their country at the opening ceremony and closing ceremony of the Olympic Games. The first flag bearer for Tuvalu was Logona Esau, a weightlifter, in 2008.

See also
 List of Tuvaluan records in athletics

References

External links